Manganese laurate is an metal-organic compound with the chemical formula . The compound is classified as a metallic soap, i.e. a metal derivative of a fatty acid (lauric acid).

Preparation
Reaction of sodium laurate with manganese chloride.

Physical properties
Manganese laurate forms pale pink chrystalline powder.

Insoluble in water, soluble in alcohol. Slightly soluble in decane.

References

Laurates
Manganese compounds